The 2011 Greek Cup Final was the 67th final of the Greek Cup. The match took place on 30 April 2011 at Olympic Stadium. The contesting teams were Atromitos and AEK Athens. It was Atromitos' first-ever Greek Cup Final in their 88 years of existence and AEK Athens' twentieth Greek Cup Final in their 87-year history. The match that was tarnished by serious incidents caused by AEK Athens' fans afterwards.

Venue

This was the eighteenth Greek Cup Final held at the Athens Olympic Stadium, after the 1983, 1984, 1985, 1986, 1987, 1988, 1989, 1990, 1993, 1994, 1995, 1996, 1999, 2000, 2002, 2009 and 2010 finals.

The Athens Olympic Stadium was built in 1982 and renovated once in 2004. The stadium is used as a venue for AEK Athens and Panathinaikos and was used for Olympiacos and Greece in various occasions. Its current capacity is 69,618 and hosted 3 UEFA European Cup/Champions League Finals in 1983, 1994 and 2007, a UEFA Cup Winners' Cup Final in 1987, the 1991 Mediterranean Games and the 2004 Summer Olympics.

Background
Atromitos had never competed in a Cup Final.

AEK Athens had qualified for the Greek Cup Final nineteen times, winning twelve of them. They last won the Cup in 2002 (2–1 against Olympiacos). They last played in a Final was in 2009, where they had lost to Olympiacos by 15–14 on a penalty shootout, which came after a 4–4 draw at the end of the extra time.

Route to the final

Match

Details

See also
2010–11 Greek Football Cup

References

2011
Cup Final
Greek Cup Final 2011
Greek Cup Final 2011
Sports competitions in Athens
April 2011 sports events in Europe